Gilles Poitras is a Canadian author of books relating to anime and manga. He is a librarian at Golden Gate University in San Francisco. In addition to the books he has authored, Poitras also regularly contributed columns to Newtype USA, a former monthly magazine which covered anime and manga industry and related popular culture.

Poitras has appeared in several documentaries discussing various aspects of anime and manga fan culture, and has been a guest at over 35 fan and industry conventions.

Education 
Born in Quebec, Poitras has two Master's degrees, a Library Science Master's from the University of California at Berkeley and a Master's in Theology from Pacific School of Religion in Berkeley.

Books
Listed chronologically in ascending order:

References

External links

 

Anime and manga critics
Canadian librarians
Writers from San Francisco
Year of birth missing (living people)
Living people
Writers from Quebec